Poverty and Other Delights is a Canadian drama film from Quebec, directed by Denys Arcand and released in 1996. The film stars Benoît Brière and Gaston Lepage as Joseph and Marcel, two homeless men living on the streets of Montreal.

The film was written by Claire Richard, a volunteer with a housing assistance program in Montreal. It was originally intended as a television film for Télévision de Radio-Canada.

References

External links
 

1996 films
1996 drama films
Canadian drama films
Films directed by Denys Arcand
French-language Canadian films
1990s Canadian films